Mary Black (born 1955) is an Irish singer.

Mary Black may also refer to:

Mary Black (artist) (1737–1814), English portrait painter
Mary Black (historian) (1922–1992), American art historian
Mary Black (Salem witch trials), American slave accused of witchcraft during the Salem witch trials
Mary Ann Black (1801–1861), wife of Prosper de Mestre (1789–1844) a prominent Sydney businessman
MaryAnn Black (1943–2020), American social worker and politician
Mary E. Black (1895–1989), Canadian occupational therapist, teacher, master weaver and writer
Mary Holiday Black (born c.1934), Navajo basket weaver
Mary J. L. Black (1879–1939), Canadian librarian and suffragist

See also
Black (surname)
Mhairi Black (born 1994), Scottish National Party politician
Mari Black, American musician